Jovan "Jovo" Bosančić (born 7 August 1970) is a retired Serbian footballer who played as a right midfielder.

Club career
Born in Novi Sad, SR Serbia, Bosančić started playing football at the age of 10 when he joined the youth team of FK Vojvodina.  He made his debut as a senior in the 1988–89 season and played in the Yugoslav First League until 1992.

Bosančić then moved to Portugal where he spent most of his career, playing for C.F. União (two seasons), S.C. Campomaiorense, Barnsley and En Avant Guingamp, and finishing his career with União's Madeira neighbours C.D. Nacional.

He helped the Tykes gain promotion to the Premier League for the first time in the club's history, only to be immediately relegated. Whilst in the Premier League he scored twice, in games against Blackburn Rovers and Southampton. He retired from football in 2003, at the age of 33.

References

External links

1970 births
Living people
Footballers from Novi Sad
Yugoslav footballers
Serbian footballers
Association football midfielders
Yugoslav First League players
FK Vojvodina players
Primeira Liga players
C.F. União players
S.C. Campomaiorense players
C.D. Nacional players
Premier League players
English Football League players
Barnsley F.C. players
Ligue 2 players
En Avant Guingamp players
Serbian expatriate footballers
Expatriate footballers in France
Expatriate footballers in England
Expatriate footballers in Portugal